Only Unity Saves the Serbs is a popular motto and slogan in Serbia and among Serbs, often used as a rallying call against foreign domination and during times of national crisis. The phrase is an interpretation of what is taken to be four Cyrillic letters for "S" (written С) on the Serbian cross, itself originally a Byzantine symbol. Popular tradition attributes the motto to Saint Sava, the founder of the Serbian Orthodox Church. However, the true author is Jovan Dragašević.

Origin

Serbian cross
 
The Serbian cross is based on the Palaiologos symbol, a cross with four Β for the motto "King of Kings, Ruling Over Kings" (Basileus Basileōn, Basileuōn Basileuontōn). In the Middle Ages, both the "Greek style", with closed fire-steels (Β—B), and the "Serbian syle", with open fire-steels (С—S), were used in Serbia. It has been argued that the Serbian cross was used as a national symbol already in the 14th century. The symbol was used in the Illyrian Armorials for Serbia. The Serbian cross reappeared during the First Serbian Uprising against the Ottoman Empire, from 1804 to 1813, and has since been used in state insignia. It served as a reference to the medieval Serbian Empire and professed the part which Serbs played in defending Christendom against the Ottoman Empire in the 14th century.

Association with Saint Sava
According to legend, the origin of the С-shaped Serbian cross lies with Saint Sava, the first Archbishop of the autocephalous Serbian Church and the patron saint of Serbs, who based his design on the Byzantine original.

Jovan Sterija Popović in his dramatic historical allegory San Kraljevića Marka ("Dream of Prince Marko", 1847) was the first to associate the motto with the four firesteels. The association of the motto with Saint Sava originates with the poem Smrt svetog Save ("Death of St. Sava", 1882) by Milorad Šimić. Saint Sava is said to have uttered it to urge the Serbian people to declare national autonomy and resist domination by the Roman Catholic Church.

The motto represents the "idea of betrayal", one of the main themes in the Kosovo Myth – the antithesis of Miloš Obilić's heroism embodied in the figure of Vuk Branković, which legend holds fled the battlefield, the moral of the story being that discord and betrayal among the Serbs had doomed the nation to fall. The slogan became a catch phrase.

The popular interpretation of the four "С" as 'Само Слога Србина Спасава' on the Serbian coat of arms dates to the 19th century, created due to nationalistic and political reasons. Jovan Sterija Popović in his dramatic historical allegory San Kraljevića Marka (1847) was the first to state that the firesteels were four "С" letters to be read that way, which "pious patriotic souls have already took for sure" as said by Đorđe Petrović in the Srbadija magazine for 1881.

Early variants
Author Biljana Vankovska argues that the first interpretation of the acronym СССС was "Serbia Alone Saved Herself" (Sama Srbija sebe spasila), which then changed to "Only Unity Saves the Serbs" (Samo sloga Srbe spasava), reflecting the growing Serb fear of internal enemies. In the poem Jeka od gusala ("echoes of gusles", 1860), general and writer Jovan Dragašević (1836–1915) wrote "Only concord saves the Serb, so it is written for the Serb on the coat of arms" (Само Слога Србина Спасава, тако Србу пише и на грбу). Serbian poet and Orthodox priest Jovan Sundečić (1825–1900) in Osvetnici, ili nevina žrtva (1868) used "Only Unity saves Slavdom" (Samo sloga Slavenstvo spašava). In Pesme i običai (1869), a collection of poetry and traditions collected by M. S. Milojević, several interpretations are made. The same phrase as earlier used by Dragašević was used in the poem Smrt svetog Save ("Death of St. Sava", 1882) by Milorad Šimić. The phrase is found in written on towels and engraved on gusle dating to the 1880s and 1890s. Allegedly, the motto Samo sloga Srbina spasava was acronymed on the Montenegrin cap. It is used, acronymed, in Easter egg decorating.

The phrase was used in songs of the Serbian Sokol movement. In Vladan Đorđević's Car Dušan: Mladi kralj ("Emperor Stefan Dušan: Young ruler", 1919), in the introduction, it is said "Because only unity saves, not only the Serb, but the Croat and Slovene, Orthodox, Catholics and Muslims".

Contemporary use
During World War II, the Main Staff of Chetnik Detachments in Bosnia and Herzegovina used it as an appeal in their struggle.

The acronym began appearing in Serbian nationalist graffiti during the 1980s. In 1989, Serbian President Slobodan Milošević delivered his infamous Gazimestan speech before a large, stone Orthodox cross bearing the acronym. In the early 1990s, as Yugoslavia began to disintegrate, Milošević's propaganda apparatus adopted the phrase "Only Unity Saves the Serbs". The acronym form of the phrase was featured with the Serbian cross on the insignia of the Army of the Republic of Serb Krajina during the Croatian War and on the insignia of the Army of Republika Srpska during the Bosnian War. The Serbian cross with the СССС acronym was also used as a wing and fuselage marking on aircraft used by the Republika Srpska Air Force. The phrase was often scrawled on the walls of abandoned houses in towns captured by Serb forces, usually followed alongside the acronym JNA (for Yugoslav People's Army) and the names of individual soldiers. In the immediate aftermath of the Yugoslav Wars, license plates throughout the Republika Srpska featured the acronym. These were replaced several years later, following the introduction of nationwide license plates.

Serbian singer-songwriter Bora Đorđević adapted the motto as the title to his song Samo sloga Srbina spasava, written during the 1999 NATO bombing of Yugoslavia.

In 2010, on the anniversary of the Battle of Loznica, Patriarch Irinej said that only unity could save the Serb people, and nonunity could ruin it.

In 2013, Slovene politician and EP member Jelko Kacin congratulated that Kosovo Serb representatives had united despite political differences, in a delegation to the EP, with the words "Bravo, Serbs, only unity saves the Serbs".

An international conference of Serbian Orthodox youth with the name has been held in 2015 and 2016 in Republika Srpska.

Notes

References

 
 
 
 
 
 
 
 
 
 
 
 
 
 
  

Serbian culture
National mottos
Serbian nationalism
Saint Sava
Serb culture
History of the Serbs